The Great Wall of China is a series of stone and earthen fortifications in China.

Great Wall or Great Wall of China may also refer to:

Astronomy
 CfA2 Great Wall, the original Great Wall of galaxies, or Northern Great Wall 
 Hercules–Corona Borealis Great Wall
 Sloan Great Wall

Business
 Great Wall Airlines, a Chinese cargo airline
 Great Wall Motors, a Chinese automobile manufacturer
 Great Wall Wine, a Chinese wine producer

Film
 A Great Wall, 1986 comedy film
 The Great Wall (film), a 2016 monster film
 Great Wall Film Company, a Shanghai studio
 Great Wall Movie Enterprises Ltd, a Hong Kong studio

Literature
 The Great Wall of China (collection), a collection of short stories by Franz Kafka
 "The Great Wall of China" (short story), a 1917 short story by Franz Kafka

Music
 Great Wall of China (album), an album by Tangerine Dream
 The Great Wall (soundtrack), a soundtrack album from the 2016 film
 "Great Wall" (Boom Crash Opera song) (1986)
 "The Great Wall", a 1986 song by the Dead Kennedys from Bedtime for Democracy
 "The Great Wall", a 2001 song by Sloan from Pretty Together

Other uses
 Great Wall Marathon, a marathon held by and on the wall
 Great Wall Station, a Chinese research station in Antarctica
 Miaojiang Great Wall or Southern Great Wall, a fortification in Hunan Province, China

See also
 Border wall
 Chinese wall (disambiguation)
 Grand Wall (or Stawamus Chief Mountain), in Squamish, British Columbia, Canada
 Great Firewall of China, the media censorship policy in place in China
 Green Wall of China, a planned forest designed to hold back the Gobi Desert
 Hadrian's Wall, built by Romans in Britain
 Long Wall (disambiguation)
 Volcanic dike wall, Spanish Peaks in La Veta, Colorado, United States